Pir Syed Muhammad Binyamin Rizvi (Urdu: پیر سید محمد بنیامین رضوی)  15 Aug 1959 - 24 June 2004) was a Pakistani politician. He was the oldest son of Pir Syed Mohammad Yaqoob Shah (a famous spiritual and religious scholar, and member of the provincial assembly who died on 31 August 1991). On 24 June 2004, he was brutally murdered in Lahore near his house. He is buried next to his father, the late Pir Syed Mohammad Yaqoob Shah, in his hometown of Phalia.

Education
Rizvi received a degree in civil engineering from the G.C.T Government College of Technology, Lahore in 1980, and a degree from Allama Iqbal Open University in Islamabad in 1981.

Political career
He was elected as a MPA (Member of the Provincial Assembly) of the Punjab in  1991 after his father death. And in 1997, he was re-elected as a MPA from PP-99. In his very 1st term he served as an advisor to the Chief Minister Punjab in 1992, and in his 2nd term he became Minister for Social Welfare, Women Development, and Bait-ul-Maal of Punjab until the proclamation of Emergency in 1999. In 2001, he became vice president of PML(N) Punjab and he held that seat until his death in 2004.

References

1958 births
2004 deaths
Allama Iqbal Open University alumni
People murdered in Lahore
People from Mandi Bahauddin District
Assassinated Pakistani politicians
Punjab MPAs 1990–1993
Punjab MPAs 1997–1999
Provincial ministers of Punjab